Daniel Patrick Quinn (born September 11, 1970) is an American football coach who is the defensive coordinator for the Dallas Cowboys of the National Football League (NFL). He came to prominence as the defensive coordinator of the Seattle Seahawks from 2013 to 2014, serving as the play-caller for the team's Legion of Boom secondary. Under Quinn, Seattle led the league in defense and made two consecutive Super Bowl appearances, winning the franchise's first in Super Bowl XLVIII. This success led to Quinn being named head coach of the Atlanta Falcons, where he served for six seasons.

Quinn's most successful season with the Falcons came in 2016 when he led the team to Super Bowl LI, an accomplishment overshadowed by them surrendering the largest lead in Super Bowl history. Atlanta would make the playoffs only one more time under Quinn, leading to his firing early into 2020.

Following his time in Atlanta, Dan Quinn would become the defensive coordinator for the Cowboys in 2021. Quinn would completely change the defensive culture in his first year with the team. Dallas quickly went from having one of the worst defenses in the league to having one of the best. As a result, Quinn would go on to be named NFL Assistant coach of the Year for the 2021 season.

Early life and playing career
Born in Morristown, New Jersey, Quinn grew up in nearby Morris Township and played high school football at Morristown High School in Morristown, from which he graduated in 1989. Quinn attended Salisbury State University (now Salisbury University), an NCAA Division III school, and played on its football team as a defensive lineman from 1990 to 1993. He was a four-year starter in football and track and field and was named All Mason-Dixon in 1994 for his record-breaking hammer throw (168.8 feet) while also representing Salisbury State in the NCAA track championships that year. Quinn was a two-time football team captain and captained the track and field team in 1994. After the 1993 football season, he was co-awarded the prestigious Bobby Richards award. Quinn was inducted in the Salisbury University athletics Hall of Fame in 2005.

Coaching career

Early career
Quinn began his coaching career with the William & Mary Tribe football team in 1994 and at Virginia Military Institute in 1995, working with their defensive lines. From 1996 to 1999, Quinn served as the defensive line coach at Hofstra and their defensive coordinator and defensive line coach in 2000.

San Francisco 49ers
In 2001, Quinn was hired as a defensive quality control coach by the San Francisco 49ers under head coach Steve Mariucci. In 2003, Quinn was promoted to defensive line coach.

Miami Dolphins
In 2005, Quinn was hired by the Miami Dolphins as their defensive line coach under new head coach Nick Saban.

New York Jets
In 2007, Quinn was hired in the same role by the New York Jets.

Seattle Seahawks
On January 12, 2009, Quinn was hired as an assistant head coach and defensive line coach by the Seattle Seahawks under new head coach Jim L. Mora.

University of Florida
In 2011, Quinn left Seattle to serve as the defensive coordinator and defensive line coach for the Florida Gators during the 2011 and 2012 seasons.

Seattle Seahawks (second stint)  

On January 17, 2013, Quinn returned to Seattle as their defensive coordinator, this time under head coach Pete Carroll, and replacing Gus Bradley, who became the Jacksonville Jaguars head coach. Quinn was a 2012 finalist for the Broyles Award, given annually to the nation's top assistant coach.

In Quinn's first season as defensive coordinator, the Seahawks led the league in fewest points allowed, fewest yards allowed, and takeaways with 231, 4,378, and 39, respectively, to become the first team since the 1985 Chicago Bears to accomplish the feat; the Seahawks went on to win Super Bowl XLVIII over the Denver Broncos 43-8.

Atlanta Falcons
On February 2, 2015, a day after the Seattle Seahawks lost Super Bowl XLIX to the New England Patriots, Quinn reached an agreement to become the head coach of the Atlanta Falcons.

2015 season

On September 14, Quinn won his first game as the head coach of the Falcons, when his team beat the visiting Philadelphia Eagles 26–24 on Monday Night Football. The Falcons got off to a hot 5–0 start in Quinn's first season, but finished the season 8–8 and missed the playoffs.

2016 season (Super Bowl LI)

In the 2016 season, Quinn's Falcons finished the year with an 11–5 record, which was good enough to win the NFC South and clinch a first-round bye in the playoffs. In the Divisional Round, the Falcons defeated Quinn's former team, the Seattle Seahawks by a score of 36–20, advancing to the NFC Championship for just the fourth time in franchise history.

On January 22, 2017, the Falcons won the NFC Championship against the Green Bay Packers by a score of 44–21, clinching a berth to play in Super Bowl LI against the New England Patriots. Despite being up 21–3 at halftime and 28–3 in the third quarter, the Falcons blew the largest lead in Super Bowl history and lost the game by a score of 34–28 in the first Super Bowl to be decided in overtime.

2017 season

In the 2017 season, the Falcons finished the year 10–6, which was only good enough for 3rd in the NFC South, but also good enough for the 6th seed in the playoffs. In the Wild Card Round, the Falcons defeated the 3rd seeded Los Angeles Rams by a score of 26–13 and advanced to the Divisional Round. In the Divisional Round, the Falcons lost on the road to the eventual Super Bowl champion Philadelphia Eagles by a score of 15–10.

2018 season

In the 2018 season, the Falcons were injury riddled throughout the season, losing seven starters to injured reserve and more for at least a game. Ultimately, the team finished 7–9, which placed the Falcons at second in the NFC South, and as the eight seed in the NFC, missing the playoffs for the first time since 2015. Following the firing of defensive coordinator Marquand Manuel, Quinn took on the position of defensive coordinator for the Falcons.

2019 season

In the 2019 season, the Falcons started the first half of the season going 1–7 with growing speculation that Falcons owner Arthur Blank would fire Quinn sometime during or at the end of the season. However, after a defensive turnaround with Quinn distributing some of the defensive play-calling duties to assistants, the team finished the season at 7–9, again placing second in the NFC South and missing the playoffs for a second consecutive year. Blank announced that Quinn would return for the 2020 season after the season.

2020 season

The Falcons began the season with a 38-24 loss to the Seattle Seahawks 38–25. This loss marked Quinn's 40th loss of his head coaching career including playoff losses. On October 11, 2020, after an 0–5 start to the season, the Falcons' first since 1997, Quinn, along with general manager Thomas Dimitroff, was fired by the Falcons. The team named defensive coordinator Raheem Morris as the interim head coach. Quinn finished his tenure in Atlanta with a 43–42 (.506) regular season record, 3–2 (.600) playoff record and a 46–44 (.511) career record.

Dallas Cowboys

2021 season
On January 11, 2021, Quinn was hired by the Dallas Cowboys as their defensive coordinator under head coach Mike McCarthy, replacing Mike Nolan, who was dismissed following the 2020 season. On December 2, 2021, Quinn stepped in as acting head coach for the Cowboys while McCarthy was out after testing positive for COVID-19. The Cowboys beat the New Orleans Saints on the road by a score of 27-17.

In Quinn's first season as the Cowboys' defensive coordinator, the team finished atop the NFC East with a 12–5 record. A year after the Cowboys allowed a franchise-record 473 points and second-most rushing yards in franchise history, Quinn's defensive unit ranked 19th in the league in yards allowed per game (5.5), eighth in opponent's points per game (21.2) and first in takeaways (34).

After the season, it was reported in the media that Quinn was a sought-after head coach candidate, having interviewed for the vacancies of the Denver Broncos, Chicago Bears, Miami Dolphins, Minnesota Vikings and New York Giants. In the end, he opted to return to the Cowboys and keep the continuity of its coaching staff.

2022 season
On January 28, 2022, the Cowboys signed Quinn to a multi-year contract extension. In February 2022, he was named the 2021 AP NFL Assistant Coach of the Year.

Following head coach interviews with the Denver Broncos, Arizona Cardinals and Indianapolis Colts in January 2023, Quinn publicly announced his decision to stay as the Cowboys' defensive coordinator.

Head coaching record

References

External links

1970 births
Living people
People from Morris Township, New Jersey
Players of American football from New Jersey
American football defensive linemen
Morristown High School (Morristown, New Jersey) alumni
Salisbury Sea Gulls football players
Track and field athletes from New Jersey
College men's track and field athletes in the United States
American male hammer throwers
William & Mary Tribe football coaches
VMI Keydets football coaches
Hofstra Pride football coaches
San Francisco 49ers coaches
Miami Dolphins coaches
New York Jets coaches
Seattle Seahawks coaches
Florida Gators football coaches
Atlanta Falcons head coaches
Dallas Cowboys coaches
National Football League defensive coordinators